Diego López de Haro may refer to:

 Diego López I de Haro (died 1124×6)
 Diego López II de Haro (1162 – 1214)
 Diego López III de Haro (died 1254)
 Diego López IV de Haro (died 1289)
 Diego López V de Haro (c. 1250 – 1310)
 Diego López VI de Haro, son of Maria of Portugal, Lady of Meneses and Orduña
Diego López de Haro y Sotomayor (died 1582) I Marques of Carpio

See also
 Diego López (disambiguation)
 Lope Díaz de Haro (disambiguation)